Kattimedu is a small village situated in Tiruvarur district of Tamil Nadu, India. It belongs to Kattimedu and Adirangam Panchayat.

Geography
A post office, bank, ATM and Forex services are situated at the main road. The nearby town is Thiruthuraipoondi(5 km).  The nearest railway station is situated at Thiruthuraipoondi (5 km). The nearest International airport is situated at Tiruchirapalli also known as Trichy (110 km). The nearby police station is Tiruthuraipoondi (5 km).  The port of Nagapattinam is situated 45 km from the village.

Water bodies 
The village people are dependent on the North East monsoon and the Cauvery river for irrigation. 
Kattimedu has 15 ponds and a river cutting across Kattimedu and Adhirangam.
There is still some problem in good drinking water because mostly water is salty here. The river Mulliaru cuts across Kattimedu and Adhirangam so there are some shutters to control the flow of water during irrigation.

Climate 

This village have 4 types of seasons:
Winter - occurring between Jan and March The year's coldest months are December and January, when temperatures average around(20-25) C.
Summer or Pre-Monsoon - lasting from March to June. Temperatures average around (32-40) C. The hottest months are April and May.
Monsoon or Rainy
Post-monsoon

Sports 
Kattimedu has a volleyball court and a large number of cricket grounds. There are other traditional sports played, namely Otha kai first, Kitty pill, goli, Pamparam, puttu.
Volleyball and Cricket are the most popular sports in the village.

Religious places 
Kattimedu has a temple near the mosque as a symbol of harmony and unity in diversity. There is also a church of St. John near the government school.
There are four mosques. 
Kattimedu has Dharga, which is famous for the celebrations during the year, and a 400- to 500 year-old perumal temple situated in Adirangam. 
Vellankani church, which is a famous Christian religious spot, is 35 km away.
Nagore Dharga, which is a famous Muslim religious spot, is 40 km away.
Thiruvarur and Thanjavur are the two famous Hindu religious spots nearby.

Economy 
The majority of residents make their living from agriculture, but an increasing number of people travel to gulf countries for employment.

Food 
Birni Kanju, chicken biriyani, murthapa, mutton biriyani, nombu kanju, syed hussin kadai porata, and salna are some of the best food cooked here. Vatlapam, Jalar Parata, Parata, Koliyappam, Thomrodu, Inju kothu paniyaram, Seeni Vada are also famous here.

Educational institutes 

Kattimedu has a matriculation school and a Government school.
The government high school is located at the main road; nearly 500 students study there.
There are 16 schools situated in and around Thiruthuraipoondi which is the nearest town for the village.

Hospitals 
The nearest medical facilities are available in Thiruthuraipoondi which houses around 10 mid-sized hospitals. There are some good doctors including surgeons and gynaecologists who are from this village itself but for critical patients it is necessary to run to Thanjavur which is around 60 km from here and it takes around two and half hours of travel.

References

Villages in Tiruvarur district